Herbert Seabrook Spencer (born September 23, 1959) is a former American football linebacker. He played for the Atlanta Falcons in 1987.

References

1959 births
Living people
American football linebackers
Newberry Wolves football players
Birmingham Stallions players
Atlanta Falcons players